This is a graphical lifespan timeline of Kings of Romania.  The kings are listed in order of office.

External links
 Romanian Royal Family

King of Romania

Romanian history timelines